Cora Lynn is a bounded rural locality in Victoria, Australia, 68 km south-east of Melbourne's Central Business District, located within the Shire of Cardinia local government area. Cora Lynn recorded a population of 220 at the 2021 census.

History
Cora Lynn Post Office opened on 1 July 1907 and closed in 1999. The Cora Lynn State School opened in January 1907 and was originally called Koo-Wee-Rup West. The School closed and became part of Pakenham Consolidated School when it opened in May 1951. The now demolished, Cora Lynn Hall (known as Keast Hall)  was opened in 1911. The official opening of June 13 was abandoned as the hall was flooded with three feet of water

Today
Cora Lynn has an Australian Rules football and Netball club which currently competes in the West Gippsland Football Netball League. They previously competed in the Ellinbank and District Football Netball League.

See also
 Shire of Pakenham – Cora Lynn was previously within this former local government area.

References

Shire of Cardinia